Atack is a surname. Notable people with the surname include:

Emily Atack (born 1989), British actress, comedian, impressionist, and television presenter
Jeremy Atack (born 1949), American economic historian
Lee Atack (born 1951), American soccer player